The law of obligations is one branch of private law under the civil law legal system and so-called "mixed" legal systems. It is the body of rules that organizes and regulates the rights and duties arising between individuals. The specific rights and duties are referred to as obligations, and this area of law deals with their creation, effects and extinction.

An obligation is a legal bond (vinculum iuris) by which one or more parties (obligants) are bound to act or refrain from acting. An obligation thus imposes on the obligor a duty to perform, and simultaneously creates a corresponding right to demand performance by the obligee to whom performance is to be tendered.

History
The word originally derives from the Latin "obligare" which comes from the root "lig" which suggests being bound, as one is to God for instance in "re-ligio". This term first appears in Plautus' play Truculentus at line 214.

Obligations did not originally form part of Roman Law, which mostly concerned issues of succession, property, and family relationships. It developed as a solution to a gap in the system, when one party committed a wrong against another party. These situations were originally governed by a basic customary law of revenge. This undesirable situation eventually developed into a system of liability where people were at first encouraged and then essentially forced to accept monetary compensation from the wrongdoer or their family instead of seeking vengeance. This signaled an important shift in the law away from vengeance and towards compensation. The state supported this effort by standardizing amounts for certain wrongs. Thus the earliest form of Obligation law derives out of what we would today call Delict.

However, it is important to note that liability in this form did not yet include the idea that the debtor "owed" monetary compensation to the creditor, it was merely a means of avoiding punishment. If the debtor or his family didn't have the means to pay then the old rules still applied as outlined in the Twelve Tables, specifically Table III. This section, despite how harsh it may appear to us, was originally developed as a means to protect debtors from the excessive abuses of creditors.

Definition
Justinian first defines an obligation (obligatio) in his Institutes, Book 3, section 13 as "a legal bond, with which we are bound by necessity of performing some act according to the laws of our State." He further separates the law of obligations into contracts, delicts, quasi-contracts, and quasi-delicts.

Nowadays, obligation, as applied under civilian law, means a legal tie (vinculum iuris) by which one or more parties (obligants) are bound to perform or refrain from performing specified conduct (prestation). Thus an obligation encompasses both sides of the equation, both the obligor's duty to render prestation and the obligee's right to receive prestation. It differs from the common-law concept of obligation which only encompasses the duty aspect.

Every obligation has four essential requisites otherwise known as the elements of obligation. They are:
 the obligor: obligant duty-bound to fulfill the obligation; he who has a duty.
 the obligee: obligant entitled to demand the fulfillment of the obligation; he who has a right.
 the subject matter, the prestation: the performance to be tendered.
 a legal bond, the vinculum juris: the cause that binds or connects the obligants to the prestation.

Classification in Roman Law

Sources

Obligations arising out of the will of the parties are called voluntary, and those imposed by operation of law are called involuntary. Sometimes these are called conventional and obediential. The events giving rise to obligations may be further distinguished into specified categories. 
 voluntary:
 unilateral promise (pollicitatio) - undertaking by promisor only to perform, not requiring the promisee’s agreement
 contract
 quasi-contract
 negotiorum gestio - duty to repay an intervenor (gestor) who has managed the affairs or property of another (dominus negotii) who was unable to so
 solutio indebiti - undue payment or delivery of a thing to another (accipiens), who is then obligated to return the thing to the payer (solvens)
 involuntary:
 delicts and quasi-delicts (equivalent to the common-law tort).
 unjust enrichment (condictio indebiti)

One of the first known classifications was made by Gaius in his Institutes, who divided obligations into obligations ex contractu (obligations arising from legal actions) and obligations ex delicto (obligations arising from illegal, unlawful actions). However, since this classification was obviously too vague, in his work Res cottidinanae Gaius classified all obligations into the aforementioned obligations ex contractu and obligations ex delicto, as well as obligations ex variis causarum figuris, which was a heterogeneous category that was supposed to include all the cases of obligations not arising from delicts or contracts.

The most precise Roman classification of obligations was featured in Justinian's Institutes (not to be confused by Gaius' Institutes), which classified them as obligations arising from contracts (ex contractu), those arising from delicts (ex maleficio), those arising from quasi-contracts (quasi ex contractu), and those arising from quasi-delicts (quasi ex maleficio).

Contracts

A contract can be broadly defined as an agreement that is enforceable at law. Gaius classified contracts into four categories which are: contracts consensu, verbal contracts, contracts re, and contracts litteris. But this classification cannot cover all the contracts, such as pacts and innominate contracts; thus, it is no longer used. According to many modern legal scholars, the most important classification of contracts is that of contracts consensu, which only require the consent of wills to create obligations, and formal contracts, which have to be concluded in a specific form in order to be valid (for example, in many European countries a contract regulating the purchase of real estate must be concluded in a special written form that is validated by a public notary).

Delicts

Quasi-contracts
Quasi-contracts are supposed to be sources of obligations very similar to contracts, but the main difference is that they are not created by an agreement of wills. The main cases are negotiorum gestio (conducting of another person's affairs without their authorization), unjust enrichment, and solutio indebiti. This Roman classification is quite controversial for today's standards, since many of these cases would be considered as completely different from contracts (most notably unjust enrichment), and would instead be classified as delicts or special sources of obligations.They are formed by impication from circumstances regardless or the assent or dissent of parties. They are called quasi-contracts. The following are the examples of quasi-contractual obligations under the Roman law;

Quasi-delicts

The designation comprised a group of actions that are very similar to delicts, but lacking one of key elements of delicts. It includes res suspensae, responsibility for things poured or thrown out of buildings, responsibility of shippers/innkeepers/stablekeepers, and erring judges. For example, the responsibility of innkeepers creates obligations when certain things left by guests in the lodging are destroyed, damaged or lost by the innkeeper's assistants or employees . In this case, the innkeeper is responsible for the damages to the guest's property, even though he did not cause them personally.

Subject matter

Obligations are classified according to the nature of the performance (prestation):
 real obligation - related somehow to immovable property
 obligation to give - obligations to give or possession, or enjoyment
 specific obligation - delivery of a determinate thing when it is particularly designated or physically separated from all others of the same class
 generic obligation - delivery of a generic thing
 personal obligations - undertakings either to do or not do all kinds of work or service
 positive personal obligation - undertaking or obligation to do
 negative personal obligation - forbearance or obligation to not do

See also
 Right
 Solidary obligations
 Swiss Code of Obligations

References